Diego Nunes (born July 12, 1986 in Curitiba) is a Brazilian racing driver.

Career

Formula Renault
Nunes began his car racing career by driving full-time in the Formula Renault 2.0 Brazil championship in 2003 and 2004, having competed in selected events in 2002. With a best result of ninth in the drivers' championship in 2004, Nunes moved on to concentrate on different motorsport series from 2005, but still returned to Brazilian FRenault for the occasional race in that year and the next.

Formula Three
Nunes switched to Formula Three Sudamericana for 2005, finishing fourth in the championship at his first attempt. In 2006 he took pole position for half of the races but was only able to win one, restricting him to third in the championship.

Formula 3000
In 2006, Nunes competed in two races of the Euroseries 3000. For 2007, he moved to Europe full-time to drive a full season in the series. Employed by the former Formula One team, Minardi, he finished as runner-up in the championship.

GP2 Series

Nunes was recruited by Adrián Campos to drive for his team in the inaugural GP2 Asia Series season in 2008, but switched to David Price Racing after the first round of the championship. This was because Price had fired his driver Andy Soucek, who had himself signed for the rival FMS International team for the GP2 Series proper that year. Nunes scored two points and finished nineteenth in the championship.

Nunes continued with DPR for the 2008 GP2 Series season, where he was partnered by Michael Herck and Giacomo Ricci on his way to 22nd in the championship. For the 2009 championship, he switched to frontrunners iSport International alongside rookie Giedo van der Garde. He finished the championship in 20th place.

For the 2009–10 GP2 Asia Series season, Nunes partnered Luca Filippi at Team Meritus for the first round in Abu Dhabi, but was replaced by Alexander Rossi for the second Abu Dhabi round.

Stock Car Brasil
With his single-seater career petering out, Nunes returned to Brazil for 2010 to compete in the Stock Car Brasil championship, driving for the Bassani team once more. In his first year, driving a Peugeot 307 alongside first Rodrigo Sperafico and then Willian Starostik, he scored 43 points to finish 15th in the championship, capping his season with a win in the final race at Curitiba. He remained with the team for 2011 as the Peugeot teams upgraded to the 408 model, and was partnered by Denis Navarro, but was dropped in favour of Bruno Junqueira after scoring only 13 points in nine races.

Racing record

Career summary

Complete GP2 Series results
(key) (Races in bold indicate pole position) (Races in italics indicate fastest lap)

Complete GP2 Asia Series results
(key) (Races in bold indicate pole position) (Races in italics indicate fastest lap)

Complete Stock Car Brasil results
(key) (Races in bold indicate pole position) (Races in italics indicate fastest lap)

References

  Retrieved on May 6, 2008.

External links

1986 births
Living people
GP2 Series drivers
Brazilian GP2 Series drivers
Brazilian Formula Renault 2.0 drivers
Formula 3 Sudamericana drivers
Auto GP drivers
GP2 Asia Series drivers
Stock Car Brasil drivers
Sportspeople from Curitiba
ISport International drivers
David Price Racing drivers
Piquet GP drivers
Campos Racing drivers
Team Lazarus drivers
Team Meritus drivers